The umbang (Jawi: اومبڠ), also known as buluh keranting, is a traditional bowed string instrument originated in the state of Terengganu, Malaysia. It is mainly used for Saba dance performance.

Description 

The umbang is made of bamboo which has a long segment. The instrument has two rope strings with a hole in the middle. Smaller holes are poked around the instrument to produce different sound tones. The umbang is usually accompanied with a fiddle called anak umbang. The umbang is an important musical instrument as it is used by bomoh (shaman) for the Saba dance. The Saba dance is a traditional healing dance which originated from the district of Dungun, Terengganu.

References

External Links 
 Terengganu State Museum (in Malay)
 National Department for Culture and Arts Malaysia (in Malay)
 Example of Umbang used during Saba performance

 Bamboo musical instruments
 Malaysian musical instruments
 Malaysian inventions
 Bowed string instruments